Enric is a Catalan common given name, the Catalan variant of Heinrich of Germanic origin. Equivalents in other languages include Henry (English), Enrico (Italian), Henrik (Scandinavian), Henri (French, German), Enrique (Spanish) or Henrique (Portuguese) among others. Enric may refer to:

Enric Barbat (1943–2011), Catalan singer-songwriter
Enric Bernat (1923–2003), the founder of the Chupa Chups lollipop company
Enric Bernat (born 1997), Spanish footballer
Enric Bug (born 1957), Catalan comic book writer and industrial designer
Enric Casadevall Medrano, Andorran politician
Enric Duran (born 1976), anticapitalist activist
Enric Garriga i Trullols (1926–2011), Catalan politician
Enric Gensana (1936–2005), footballer
Enric Llaudet (1916–2003), Catalan businessman
Enric Madriguera (1904–1975), Catalan violinist
Enric Marco (1921–2022), author
Enric Martí Carreto, Catalan textile entrepreneur
Enric Martínez-Castignani (born 1970), Italo-Spanish baritone
Enric Mas, cyclist
Enric Masip (born 1969), handball player
Enric Miralles (1955–2000), Catalan architect
Enric Morera i Viura (or Enrique Morera) (1865–1942), Catalan musician and composer
Enric Prat de la Riba (1879–1917), Catalan politician
Enric Reyna (born 1940), builder, president of FC Barcelona in 2003
Enric Sagnier (1858–1931), Catalan architect
Enric Sala (born 1968), marine ecologist
Enric Sarasol (born 1964), Valencian pilota player
Enric Vallès (born 1990), Catalan footballer
Enric Valor i Vives (1911–2000), Valencian narrator and grammarian
Joan Enric Vives Sicília (born 1949), Bishop of Urgell and Co-Prince of Andorra

See also
Auditori Enric Granados, concert hall in Lleida

References

Catalan masculine given names